Sinyavsky is a Slavic masculine surname, its feminine counterpart is Sinyavskaya. It may refer to
Andrei Sinyavsky (1925–1997), Russian writer, dissident and political prisoner
Sinyavsky–Daniel trial
Mikołaj Hieronim Sieniawski (1645–1683), Polish nobleman
Tamara Sinyavskaya (born 1943), Russian mezzo-soprano
Vladimir Synyavsky (1932–2012), Ukrainian wrestler

See also
4981 Sinyavskaya, a minor planet

Russian-language surnames